Parrotfinches are small, colourful passerine birds belonging to the genus Erythrura in the family Estrildidae, the estrildid finches. They occur from South-east Asia to New Guinea, and many Pacific Islands. They inhabit forest, bamboo thickets and grassland and some can be found in man-made habitats such as farmland, parks and gardens. Several species are commonly kept as cagebirds.

They are 9 to 15 cm long. The plumage is usually mainly green. Most species have blue or red markings on the head and a red rump and tail. The tail is pointed and often fairly long.

Seeds, especially those of grasses, comprise the bulk of the diet. Some parrotfinches also feed on fruit and small insects. Many species forage in flocks, keeping in contact with high-pitched calls.

Three species, the green-faced, royal and pink-billed parrotfinches, are classed as vulnerable to extinction because of habitat loss and degradation.

Taxonomy
The genus Erythrura was introduced in 1837 by the English naturalist William John Swainson to accommodate the pin-tailed parrotfinch. Swainson misspelled the genus name as "Erythura". The name combines the Ancient Greek eruthros meaning "red" with -ouros meaning "-tailed". The genus Erythrura is sister to the Gouldian finch which is placed in its own genus Chloebia and together the two genera form the subfamily Erythrurinae.

Species 
The genus contains 12 species.

References

External links